6RED, branded on-air as Red FM, is an Australian radio station owned by Seven West Media.  The station serves Karratha, Western Australia.

References

Radio stations in Western Australia